Erik Ludovicus Maria Van Looy is a Belgian film director known for his thriller movies. He was born on 26 April 1962.

Van Looy is also a popular television host in Flanders who hosts De Slimste Mens ter Wereld (The Smartest Person on Earth), and has hosted De Pappenheimers. The former is a television show aired on VIER where Van Looy and his team of comical judges are on a quest to find the world's smartest person, i.e., the one who has the best knowledge of politics, history, arts, sports, media and film.

Awards and recognition 

His most famous films The Alzheimer Case and Loft have been widely appreciated by Flemish audiences as well as Flemish critics, with Loft even selling the most admission tickets of any Flemish film in theaters to date. A remake Loft produced in the Netherlands was also a success. This resulted in an American remake, which was again highly praised by Flemish audiences and critics, but not by American critics.

Films

References 

Living people
Belgian film directors
Belgian game show hosts
Flemish film people
People from Deurne, Belgium
1962 births